Johan Borups Højskole (literally Borup's Folk High School) is a folk high school situated at Frederiksholms Kanal 24 in central Copenhagen, Denmark.

History
The school was founded by Johan Borup in 1891. His maternal uncle, Ernst Trier, was the founder of Vallekilde Højskole on the Odsherred peninsula. The school obtained supplementary government funding from 1894. It moved to larger premises in the Ny Rosenborg building at Harmers Plads in 1895. Om 1916 the school's premises had once again become too small. Jens Mortensen, a farmer from kvandløse, started a national collection to raise money for a new building for the school. In 1927, it was able to purchase the mansion at Frederiksholms Kanal.

Architecture
The building is a seven-bay extension from 1748 of the slightly older mansion. The facade is decorated with pilasters, but in red brick instead of sandstone, and the cornice is omitted.

The school also has an assembly hall designed by Henning Hansen. It features a frieze by Einar Utzon-Frank.

References

External links
 Official website

1891 establishments in Denmark
Folk high schools in Denmark
Buildings and structures completed in 1748
Listed buildings and structures in Copenhagen